Alan Chambers MBE (born 1968) is a polar adventurer and motivational speaker from Scunthorpe, North Lincolnshire.

Born to a family of steel workers, Alan left school and home at sixteen and joined the Royal Marines. Nine months later he completed training and spent the next seventeen years in a front line Commando unit. Alan recalls visiting 50 countries by the time he was 30 years old.

Chambers led the first British team to walk unsupported to the Geographic North Pole from Canada.  After 70 days on the ice, he and Charlie Paton raised the Union Jack at the North Pole at 23:16 hours on 16 May 2000.

Chambers was also instrumental in planning and executing the first Winter crossing of Iceland on skis. Dragging sledges each weighing , Chambers and his team completed the  journey in 47 days.

Aged 32, Chambers was awarded the MBE by Her Majesty the Queen for Determined Leadership in Constant Adversity.

Chambers is a popular motivational and corporate away day speaker on topics including Leading at the Edge, Maintaining Team High Performance, Delivering the Impossible, Managing Adversity, Leadership and Resilience and Setbacks and Doing More with Less.

References

External links
 Alan Chambers' MBE Official Website
 Alan Chambers MBE - Explorer Speaker Bio and Video
 https://web.archive.org/web/20060513233951/http://www.teampolar2000.co.uk/ Original expedition website

1968 births
Living people
Explorers of the Arctic
Members of the Order of the British Empire
Royal Marines ranks